Riga Governorate  or the Province of Riga was the administrative region of the Russian Empire in modern southern Estonia and northern Latvia from 1713 to 1783. The Province of Riga was formed to replace the Eastern Provinces of the Kingdom of Sweden in 1713 . After the conquest of the regions of Ingermanland, Livonia and Estonia by Sweden in the Great Northern War in 1710. In 1713, the Provinces of Riga and Tallinn were separated into separate administrative units, and in 1713–1714, the organization and management of the Province of Riga were also defined.

History

On July 2, 1731, with the approval of Empress Anna I and the ukase of the Governing Senate, the island of Osel (modern Saaremaa) received the status of a special region. Saaremaa remained a region of special status until the ukase of the Russian Empress Catherine II , which on February 21, 1765 liquidated Saaremaa as an independent province.

The Provinces of Riga and Tallinn were merged under the leadership of Governor General George Browne in 1775. The All-Russian Provincial Act of 1775 was extended to the Baltic provinces and on July 3, 1783, the Riga Province ceased to exist, handing over much of its affairs to the Viceroyalty of Riga.

Administrative division

In 1721 the Province of Riga was divided into 2 provinces:

Province of Livland ( Riga, Pernov, Wenden and the island of Osel ) and the province of Smolensk Governorate ( Smolensk, Dorogobuzh, Roslavl, Vyazma )
In 1726 the Smolensk Governorate was transformed into an independent governorate. As a result, the Province of Riga was redistributed into 5 Provinces:
Riga province
Windau province
Dorpat province
Pernov province
Ezel Province
At the end of the eighteenth century. the province consisted of 9 counties:

Riga County
Wenden County
Volmar County
Valky County
Dorpat County
Pernov County
Fellin County
Verros County
Ezel County

See also
Baltic governorates

References

1713 establishments in Russia
1783 disestablishments in the Russian Empire
States and territories established in 1713
States and territories disestablished in 1783
Baltic governorates
History of Latvia
History of Estonia